Pakistan Sugar Mills Association (PASMA) is based is Islamabad, Pakistan.

PSMA was registered in Nov. 1964, established as a representative organization of all Sugar Mills in Pakistan.  Pakistan Sugar Mills Association plays a pivotal role in promoting the development and attaining efficiency in the best interest of the sugar mills and sugar allied industries within the parameters of policy of the Government of Pakistan.

See also
 Sugar refinery
 Sugar cane mill

References

External links
  Pakistan Sugar Mills Association

1964 establishments in Pakistan
Organizations established in 1964
Business organisations based in Pakistan